The Campo de Marte is one of the largest parks in the metropolitan area of Lima, capital city of Peru. Similar in size to Parque de la Exposición and Parque de la Reserva. Campo de Marte originally was part of Exposición and later a horse racetrack, the Hipódromo de Santa Beatriz (before Jesús María Ward was split from downtown Lima Ward), in operation from 1903 to 1938. A new racetrack, San Felipe, was built further south in Jesús María ward but the stand was allowed to remain; the track was paved over with asphalt and given the street name Avenida de la Peruanidad (Peruvianness Avenue). The stand is currently used for spectators watching the Grand Military Parade, done every year on July 29, the day after Independence Day.

Area: 68,850 m2

Landmarks

The park houses a monument to the war fought in 1941 between Peru and Ecuador, along with a monument from the Japanese immigrant community in Peru.  The former celebrates the ability to establish peace between the two countries, the latter resembles a bridge to symbolize the cultural connection between Peru and Japan. The park also houses the municipal stadium of Jesús María.

Gallery

References

Buildings and structures in Lima
Tourist attractions in Lima
Parks in Peru